Lactuca dolichophylla, the long-leaved lettuce, is a species of wild lettuce found in Afghanistan, Pakistan, West Himalaya, Nepal, Xizang (Tibet), East Himalaya, south-central China, and Myanmar. It prefers to grow in thickets at c.3200m above sea level. Its chromosome count is 2n=16.

References

dolichophylla
Plants described in 1966